Hammerton may refer to:

Place names in England 
 Green Hammerton, a village and civil parish in the Harrogate district of North Yorkshire
 Kirk Hammerton, a village and civil parish in the Harrogate district of North Yorkshire
 Hammerton railway station, serves the villages of Kirk Hammerton and Green Hammerton in North Yorkshire
 Hammerton's Ferry, a pedestrian and cycle ferry service across the River Thames in Richmond upon Thames, London

Other uses 
 Hammerton (surname)
 Mark Hammerton Group Ltd, a UK based travel organiser

See also
 Hammertone, a lacquer that looks like hammered metal
 Hammertown (disambiguation)